Signer may refer to :

 A sign language user
The author of a signature
A signing agent

People:
Dan Signer, Canadian-American television writer-producer
Michael Signer, American politician
Roman Signer (born 1938), Swiss visual artist 
Rudolf Signer (1903-1990), Swiss chemist
Walter Signer (1910 -1974), American baseball pitcher
Walter Signer (cyclist) (born 1937), Swiss cyclist

See also
Siner (disambiguation)
Sign (disambiguation)